In mathematics, more specifically topology, a local homeomorphism is a function between topological spaces that, intuitively, preserves local (though not necessarily global) structure. 
If  is a local homeomorphism,  is said to be an étale space over   Local homeomorphisms are used in the study of sheaves. Typical examples of local homeomorphisms are covering maps.

A topological space  is locally homeomorphic to  if every point of  has a neighborhood that is homeomorphic to an open subset of  
For example, a manifold of dimension  is locally homeomorphic to 

For example, the two dimensional sphere, being a manifold, is locally homeomorphic to the plane  but there is no local homeomorphism

Formal definition

Examples and sufficient conditions

Local homeomorphisms versus homeomorphisms

Every homeomorphism is a local homeomorphism. But a local homeomorphism is a homeomorphism if and only if it is bijective. 
A local homeomorphism need not be a homeomorphism.

Generalizing the previous two examples, every covering map is a local homeomorphism; in particular, the universal cover  of a space  is a local homeomorphism. 
In certain situations the converse is true. For example: if  is a proper local homeomorphism between two Hausdorff spaces and if  is also locally compact, then  is a covering map. 

Local homeomorphisms and composition of functions

Inclusion maps

If  is any subspace (where as usual,  is equipped with the subspace topology induced by ) then the inclusion map  is always a topological embedding.

The restriction  of a function  to a subset  is equal to its composition with the inclusion map  explicitly, 

Invariance of domain

Local homeomorphisms in analysis

It is shown in complex analysis that a complex analytic function  (where  is an open subset of the complex plane ) is a local homeomorphism precisely when the derivative  is non-zero for all  
In that case  is a point of "ramification" (intuitively,  sheets come together there). 

Using the inverse function theorem one can show that a continuously differentiable function  (where   is an open subset of ) is a local homeomorphism if the derivative  is an invertible linear map (invertible square matrix) for every  
(The converse is false, as shown by the local homeomorphism  with ). 
An analogous condition can be formulated for maps between differentiable manifolds. 

Local homeomorphisms and fibers

To clarify this statement's conclusion, let  be the (unique) largest open subset of  such that  is a local homeomorphism. 
In particular, if  then  a conclusion that may be false without the assumption that 's fibers are discrete (see this footnote for an example). 
One corollary is that every continuous open surjection  between completely metrizable second-countable spaces that has discrete fibers is "almost everywhere" a local homeomorphism (in the topological sense that  is a dense open subset of its domain). 
Because every fiber of every non-constant polynomial is finite (and thus a discrete, and even compact, subspace), this example generalizes to such polynomials whenever the mapping induced by it is an open map.

Local homeomorphisms and Hausdorffness

There exist local homeomorphisms  where  is a Hausdorff space but  is not. 
Consider for instance the quotient space  where the equivalence relation  on the disjoint union of two copies of the reals identifies every negative real of the first copy with the corresponding negative real of the second copy. 
One readily checks that the natural map  is a local homeomorphism. 
The fiber  has two elements if  and one element if  

Properties

A map is a local homeomorphism if and only if it is continuous, open, and locally injective. In particular, every local homeomorphism is a continuous and open map. A bijective local homeomorphism is therefore a homeomorphism. 

Whether or not a function  is a local homeomorphism depends on its codomain. The image  of a local homeomorphism  is necessarily an open subset of its codomain  and  will also be a local homeomorphism (that is,  will continue to be a local homeomorphism when it is considered as the surjective map  onto its image, where  has the subspace topology inherited from ).

Every fiber of a local homeomorphism  is a discrete subspace of its domain 

A local homeomorphism  transfers "local" topological properties in both directions: 
  is locally connected if and only if  is;
  is locally path-connected if and only if  is;
  is locally compact if and only if  is;
  is first-countable if and only if  is.

As pointed out above, the Hausdorff property is not local in this sense and need not be preserved by local homeomorphisms.

The local homeomorphisms with codomain  stand in a natural one-to-one correspondence with the sheaves of sets on  this correspondence is in fact an equivalence of categories. Furthermore, every continuous map with codomain  gives rise to a uniquely defined local homeomorphism with codomain  in a natural way. All of this is explained in detail in the article on sheaves.

Generalizations and analogous concepts

The idea of a local homeomorphism can be formulated in geometric settings different from that of topological spaces. 
For differentiable manifolds, we obtain the local diffeomorphisms; for schemes, we have the formally étale morphisms and the étale morphisms; and for toposes, we get the étale geometric morphisms.

See also

Notes

Citations

References

  
  
  

Theory of continuous functions
Functions and mappings
General topology